Russell Kurt Laribee (born July 30, 1956) is a former professional baseball player.

A native of Southington, Connecticut, Laribee attended Southington High School and the University of Connecticut. In 1976, he played collegiate summer baseball with the Harwich Mariners of the Cape Cod Baseball League, and led the league in triples with five. Drafted in the 21st round of the 1977 Draft, Laribee was a minor league outfielder. He played from 1977 through 1981 in the Boston Red Sox system, ascending as high as the team's Triple-A affiliate, the Pawtucket Red Sox.

Though Laribee is most known for that ignominious distinction, it is rarely remembered that, in the same game, it was his sacrifice fly in the bottom of the 9th inning that tied the game at 1–1, ultimately sending the game into extra innings. Pawtucket won, 3–2, while Laribee went 0-for-11.

In a five-season minor-league career, Laribee posted a combined .264 batting average with 57 home runs in 458 games.

References

External links
Baseball Reference - Minor League statistics
The Longest Game
Hall of Fame: The Bristol Bomber: Russ Laribee battled his way through the minors

Bristol Red Sox players
Elmira Pioneers players
Pawtucket Red Sox players
Winter Haven Red Sox players
UConn Huskies baseball players
Harwich Mariners players
1956 births
Living people
People from Southington, Connecticut